R1200 may refer to any of the following motorcycles:

BMW
 R1200C
 R1200GS
 R1200R
 R1200RT
 R1200S
 R1200ST

Kawasaki
 ZZ-R1200